Fanja is a town in the region Ad Dakhiliyah, in northeastern Oman. As of 2010 it had a population of 10,396.

See also
 Fanja Fort
 Fanja traditional suq

References

Populated places in Oman
Ad Dakhiliyah Governorate